Thomas Edison House is a historic house located in the Butchertown neighborhood of Louisville, Kentucky. The house is a shotgun duplex built around 1850. Thomas Edison took up residence in the same neighborhood, possibly even at this location, a part of the time he lived in Louisville from 1866 to 1867.  The house features a museum that honors Edison and his inventions.

Edison's time in Louisville
In 1866, at age 19, Thomas Edison, a skilled telegrapher, came to Louisville to work for Western Union, which at that time had an office on the corner of Main and Second Streets. In August 1866, Edison left briefly, intending to take a trip to Brazil but was turned back at New Orleans because the waterway was shut down.  So, he returned to work in Louisville and found lodging in a shotgun duplex on East Washington Street in what is now Butchertown.

In 1867, while working the night shift, Edison, already the experimenter, was working with a battery when he spilled sulfuric acid onto the floor and his boss' desk on the floor below.  The next day, he was fired, and left town for good.  Sixteen years later, in 1883, one of Edison's new inventions, the incandescent light bulb, was demonstrated in the largest installation to date in Louisville at the Southern Exposition.

See also
 List of attractions and events in the Louisville metropolitan area

References

19th-century buildings and structures in Louisville, Kentucky
Houses in Louisville, Kentucky
Historic house museums in Kentucky
Edison, Thomas
Museums in Louisville, Kentucky
Houses completed in 1850
1850 establishments in Kentucky
House